The Acres, also known as Galesburg Country Homes, is a naturalistic residential plat designed by Frank Lloyd Wright in Charleston Township, Michigan. It was listed on the National Register of Historic Places in 2004.

History
In 1947, a group of scientists from the Upjohn pharmaceutical company purchased this section of land to cooperatively build a community of homes. The group approached Frank Lloyd Wright about designing the subdivision, and he visited that same year, walking the land to gather information. Wright laid out lots in a non-conventional circular pattern, with the interstitial areas to be held in common. Starting in the late 1940s and continuing through 1960, five of the lots were developed — four with designs by Wright and one designed by Taliesin School fellow Francis "Will" Willsey. With the fifth house, coop members decided that they liked the result, and further development came to an end.

Description
The Acres consists of 21  circular lots, each 114 feet in diameter.  The plat was designed to have 50 acres of open land for community use that also included a three-acre pond. Seven of the lots are owned; only five of these contain houses. The remainder of the plat, including unbuilt lots, is held in common. Of the five houses, four are Wright-designed Usonian homes, and the fifth was designed by Taliesin School fellow Francis "Will" Willsey. The homes are located on Hawthorne Drive, a narrow and curving road bordered alternately by heavy woods, low scrub growth, and open areas. A signpost is located at the entrance to the neighborhood.

Homes in the Acres are:
David and Christine Weisblat Residence (Frank Lloyd Wright): Long in-line house with an exterior of concrete block and mahogany, built in 1951.
Eric and Pat Pratt Residence (Frank Lloyd Wright): Long in-line house with a taller central mass with an exterior of concrete block and mahogany, built in 1950–54.
Samuel and Dorothy Eppstein Residence (Frank Lloyd Wright): Long in-line house with an exterior of concrete block and mahogany, built in 1950–59.
Curtis and Lillian Meyer Residence (Frank Lloyd Wright): A "solar hemicycle" design, with exterior of concrete block and mahogany, built in 1950–51.
Günther and Anne Fonken House (Francis "Will" Willsey): T-shaped house with a low pitched roof, built in 1960.

Gallery

See also
Robert and Rae Levin House
Broadacre City
Usonia Homes

References

 Storrer, William Allin. The Frank Lloyd Wright Companion. University Of Chicago Press, 2006,  (S.294, S.295, S.296, S.297)

External links

Galesburg Country Homes on delmars.com
Frank Lloyd Wright 'Galesburg Country Homes' Site Plan 1947, USONIAN HOUSES - John Sergeant, 1984
Michigan Road Trip Wrap-Up
Curtis Meyer House website

Frank Lloyd Wright buildings
Houses in Kalamazoo County, Michigan